Siu mei is the generic Cantonese name of meats roasted on spits over an open fire or a large wood-burning rotisserie oven. It creates a unique, deep barbecue flavor and the roast is usually coated with a flavorful sauce (a different sauce is used for each variety of meat) before roasting. Siu mei is very popular in Hong Kong and Macau, and overseas Chinatowns especially with Cantonese emigrants. In Hong Kong, the average person eats siu mei once every four days, with char siu being the most popular, followed by siu yuk (Roast pork or pork belly) in second, and roast goose being third. Siu mei is also known colloquially as siu laap, as the latter term encompasses siu mei, lou mei, and other Cantonese-style cooked and preserved meats.

History
After meetings held between the Food Hygiene Select Committee, the Markets and Abattoirs Select Committee and the Street Traders Select Committee on the topic of "Sale of Cooked Food, Siu Mei, and Lo Mei in Public Markets" in 1978, siu mei shops officially entered into Hong Kong public markets. The public market is a popular place for ordinary citizens to buy siu mei.

Preparation
Siu mei is part of the family of Cantonese-style cooked meats known collectively as siu laap (which also includes lou mei and preserved meat, such as orange cuttlefish and white cut chicken. The latter dishes are not roasted at all, but are often prepared in the same kitchen and sold alongside siu mei, in what are often known as siu laap establishments or Chinese BBQ shops.

As siu mei takes a great deal of resources to prepare, requiring large ovens and rotisserie-like utilities for cooking the meat, few homes in Hong Kong, mainland China, or overseas have the equipment for it. Usually meat of this type is prepared and sold from siu laap shops located in hawker centres (in Hong Kong), food courts (overseas Chinese malls such as Pacific Mall), ethnic supermarkets (for example, the T & T Supermarket chain in Canada) and restaurants, who tend to mass-produce the numerous siu mei varieties rather than preparing it at each customer's request. The advantage of siu laap (including siu mei and lou mei) is that the resulting meat retains its flavor and texture for the whole day, in contrast to Peking duck or Crispy fried chicken which have to be served immediately after preparation and cooking (hence these are eaten in restaurants), making siu laap popular for party platters and take-out.

Take-out is quite common as customers order or prepare their own plain white rice to accompany the siu mei; a siu mei meal comprises meat atop plain white rice or noodles, and often with vegetables (napa cabbage, choy sum, or gai lan), usually served in a plastic foam take-out container or on a plate.

In Chinese fine dining and banquet halls, the barbecue platter yu chu (roasted suckling pig) or siu yuk (roasted pig belly), often in combination with char siu, soy sauce chicken, and siu aap (roasted duck), and jellyfish), is an appetizer that comprises the first dish in the ten-course Chinese banquet meal, while varieties of siu laap can also be ordered as full dishes à la carte (usually a half or whole chicken/duck/goose).

Varieties of siu laap, including siu mei and lou mei
Char siu - barbecued pork
Siu ngo - roasted goose
Siu aap - roasted duck
White cut chicken - marinated steamed chicken
Soy sauce chicken - chicken cooked with soy sauce
Siu yuk - roasted pig, with crisp skin
Yu chu - roasted suckling pig, with crisp skin
Orange cuttlefish - marinated cuttlefish
Lou sui aap yik - braised duck wings in master stock

See also

 Asado
 Barbecue
 Rotisserie
 List of spit-roasted foods
 Lou mei

References

Hong Kong cuisine
Cantonese cuisine
Cantonese words and phrases
Barbecue
Spit-cooked foods
American Chinese cuisine